Darrell Jackson (born February 1, 1957) is a Democratic member of the South Carolina Senate, representing the 21st District since 1993.

Education 
Jackson graduated from Benedict College in 1979 and attended USC School of Law and the Columbia Bible College and Seminary.

Career 
Jackson was first elected to represent the 21st District in the South Carolina Senate in 1992.

In 1996, Jackson became Senior Pastor of the Bible Way Church, a church started by his father, Andrew Jackson.

In 2016 Jackson was reelected as District 21 Senator for the State of South Carolina.

In 2020, Jackson introduced legislation to make Juneteenth a statewide holiday. In 2020, Jackson won an uncontested race for his seat.

Personal life 
Jackson is married to Willie Mae Rooks and they have two children.

References

External links
South Carolina Legislature - Senator Darrell Jackson official SC Senate website
Project Vote Smart - Senator Darrell Jackson (SC) profile
Follow the Money - Darrell Jackson
2006 2004 2002 2000 1996 campaign contributions

Democratic Party South Carolina state senators
1957 births
Living people
21st-century American politicians